Schlegel's asity (Philepitta schlegeli) is a species of bird in the family Philepittidae. It is endemic to Madagascar. Its natural habitats are subtropical or tropical dry forest and subtropical or tropical moist lowland forest. It is threatened by habitat loss.

References

External links
 Avesphoto.com: Image

Schlegel's asity
Near threatened animals
Schlegel's asity
Schlegel's asity
Schlegel's asity
Taxonomy articles created by Polbot
Madagascar dry deciduous forests